The 1985 CART PPG Indy Car World Series season was the 7th national championship season of American open wheel racing sanctioned by CART. The season consisted of 15 races. Al Unser Sr. was the national champion, and the rookie of the year was Arie Luyendyk. The 1985 Indianapolis 500 was sanctioned by USAC, but counted towards the CART points championship. Danny Sullivan won the Indy 500, in dramatic fashion, a race that became known as the "Spin and Win."

In September 1984, Rick Mears suffered serious leg injuries in a crash at Sanair. Mears drove only a part-time schedule in 1985, racing at Indianapolis, and subsequently on ovals only. Al Unser Sr. took Mears' full-time seat at Penske Racing as a substitute for the season. Unser had one win, ten top fives, and one other top ten, en route to the championship, a battle that climaxed in dramatic fashion in the final race of the season.

Season summary
Defending series champion Mario Andretti won the season opener, finished second at the Indy 500, and won the next two races, jumping out to the early points lead. A mid-season slump, however, saw him achieve only one top five finish the remainder of the year. He then broke his collarbone in a crash at Michigan, and was forced to sit out one race. The driver of the season became Al Unser Jr., who won the next two races (Meadowlands and Cleveland), and finished the year with nine finishes in the top 4.

At the midpoint of the season, Mario Andretti's points lead had dwindled, while Emerson Fittipaldi, Al Unser Sr., and Al Unser Jr. were all closing in. At the Pocono 500, Rick Mears triumphantly returned to victory lane after his leg injuries. Finishing second and third were Al Jr. and Al Sr., respectively, with Al Sr. now taking the points lead. Unser Jr. ate away at the points lead over the next four races, and the Unsers were neck-and-neck approaching the season finale. Meanwhile, Bobby Rahal was making a championship run of his own, winning 3 of 5 races, and closing within 13 points of the championship lead.

With two races to go, Unser Jr. led Unser Sr. by only 3 points. Father and son finished 1st and 2nd at Phoenix, and the standings were flipped. Al Sr. led Al Jr. by 3 points going into the finale at Miami. Rahal finished a distant 6th at Phoenix, and was mathematically eliminated from the championship.

The season finale at Tamiami Park ended in dramatic fashion. Danny Sullivan and Bobby Rahal finished 1st and 2nd, respectively, but the attention of the day was focused on the two Unsers. Late in the race, Al Unser Jr. was running third, and Al Unser Sr. was running 5th. At the moment, Al Jr. was leading the hypothetical championship standings by 1 point.

In the closing laps, Al Unser Sr. chased down and passed Roberto Moreno for 4th place. He held on to finish fourth, and thus won the championship by 1 point over his son. Unser Sr. afterwards expressed some regret about snatching the championship title from his son, but felt it was his responsibility to his own team and his own sponsors to race to his ability all the way to the end. It was also in the best interests of sportsmanship to all competitors not to give favor to his son. Unser Sr. also knew his days were numbered as a competitive driver on the circuit, while he knew Unser Jr. had many years ahead to have another chance at the title (Al Unser Jr. would indeed win the championship twice - 1990 and 1994).

The 1985 season saw two controversies at two separate races. The Michigan 500 had to be postponed for a week due to tire issues. In September, the race at Sanair came to a bizarre conclusion when the safety car, leading the field on the final lap under caution, suddenly veered into the pits on the final turn. Leader Johnny Rutherford was not informed, and second place Pancho Carter accelerated past him and beat him to the finish line. Officials initially awarded the victory to Carter, and Rutherford protested. After review, Rutherford was eventually restored the victory. (In many motorsport codes, the safety car exits to pit lane on the final lap; in most North American codes, the safety car remains on the circuit towards the finish line.)

Drivers and teams
The following teams and drivers competed in the 1985 Indy Car World Series season.  All cars used Goodyear tires.

- The number in parenthesis is the number the car used at the Indianapolis 500, if a different number was used.

Notable team and driver changes 

 Rick Mears was sidelined due to injuries for much of the season. Danny Sullivan left Doug Shierson Racing to join Team Penske.
 Al Unser Jr. left Galles Racing to replace Sullivan at Doug Shierson Racing. He was replaced at Galles Racing by Geoff Brabham, who previously drove for Kraco Racing.
 Mayer Motor Racing, which ran 1984 with drivers Tom Sneva and Howdy Holmes, did not run in 1985. Tom Sneva moved  to All American Racers, which expanded to a two car team, while Howdy Holmes moved to Forsythe Racing, who had run 1984 without a steady driver.
 Galles Racing expanded to a two car team. Joining Geoff Brabham, the second car was run by Pancho Carter on the ovals and rookie Roberto Moreno on the road courses.
 Bignotti-Cotter Racing changed its name to Team Cotter, continuing to field a car for Roberto Guerrero.
 Bill Whittington, who did not have a ride in 1984, joined Arciero Racing, replacing Pete Halsmer. Halsmer only ran a few races that year.
 Rookie Arie Luyendyk ran his first full season, driving for Provimi Veal Racing. He replaced Derek Daly, who was left without a full-time ride.
 Geoff Brabham was replaced at Kraco Racing by Kevin Cogan.
 Gordon Johncock retired shortly before the 1985 Indianapolis 500. He was replaced at Patrick Racing by rookie Bruno Giacomelli.
 Johnny Rutherford returned to full-time driving, replacing Al Holbert at Alex Morales Motorsports. Holbert returned to sports cars.
 Dick Simon scaled back to part-time driving. His ride at Dick Simon Racing was split with Raul Boesel.
 Stan Fox, who ran full-time in 1984, did not run in 1985. A variety of drivers are ran at Leader Card Racing.
 Interscope Racing and driver Danny Ongais only ran part-time in 1985.
 Tom Hess Racing, which drove most of 1984 with Dick Ferguson, also scaled back to part-time.

Season summary

Schedule 

 Oval/Speedway
 Dedicated road course
 Temporary street circuit
NC Non-championship event

The Dana 150 was scheduled for March 31, but postponed on March 13 due to track damage sustained over winter testing. On August 6, it was rescheduled for an October 13 date.

The Michigan 500 was scheduled for July 21, but postponed a week due to tire concerns. NBC did not return to televise the race.

Race results

Indianapolis was USAC-sanctioned but counted towards the CART title.

Drivers points standings

Sanair controversy
In the Sanair race (Molson Indy 300), Roberto Guerrero had a strong lead until he lost control and spun. Later in the race Jacques Villeneuve Sr. collided with leader Bobby Rahal in attempt to challenge for the lead, taking both out. The race finished under a yellow flag, but the safety car entered pit lane on the final lap, and thinking there would be a final restart, Pancho Carter passed Johnny Rutherford after the safety car entered pit lane and before the finish line.  CART initially declared Carter the winner, but an appeals panel later overturned the decision and confirmed Rutherford's victory.  In many codes of motorsport (typically FIA Code) the safety car enters pit lane as the field is on the final lap, and the cars cross the checkered flag together without the safety car on course.  However, this practice is not accepted in North America, where the safety car leads the leaders to the finish line if the safety car situation exists.

See also
 1985 Indianapolis 500

References

 
 
 
 
 ChampCarStats.com (Archived 2009-07-26)]

Champ Car seasons
IndyCar